Dan Landrum, (born 1961 in Kennett, Missouri), is an American hammered dulcimer player residing in  Chattanooga, Tennessee.
He was discovered busking in front of the Tennessee Aquarium and is a featured member of Yanni's touring orchestra.  He began touring with Yanni during the 2003/2004 Ethnicity world tour and also appears on the 2006 live album and video Yanni Live! The Concert Event.

In November 2006 Dan Landrum became the owner and editor of "Dulcimer Players News" after purchasing the magazine from Madeline MacNeil.

Discography
 Turning Point (2002)
 Questions in the Calm
 Hammer On! (with Hammer On!) (2004)
 For the Beauty (with Hannah Carson)
 Winter Mix (2005)
 Landrum & Humphries (with Stephen Humphries) (2006)

References
Interview - Dulcimer Players News
 Tennessee Aquarium Newsroom
 July 2003 artist of the month - K&K Soundsystems
 Bio at Yanni.com
Profile at Reflections an Unofficial Yanni fan page

External links
 Official web site
 Hammer On!

1961 births
Living people
People from Kennett, Missouri
American street performers
Hammered dulcimer players
People from Chattanooga, Tennessee
Musicians from Tennessee